Araunia was a town of ancient Galatia inhabited during Byzantine times. It was located on the main road between Nicaea and Ancyra near where it crosses the Sangarius River.

Its site is located southeast of Sykeon in Asiatic Turkey.

References

Populated places in ancient Galatia
Former populated places in Turkey
History of Ankara Province
Populated places of the Byzantine Empire